WHID (88.1 FM) is a radio station licensed to Green Bay. The station is part of Wisconsin Public Radio (WPR), and airs WPR's "Ideas Network", consisting of news and talk programming. WHID also broadcasts local news and programming from studios in the Instructional Services building at the University of Wisconsin–Green Bay, along with sister News & Classical Network station WPNE (89.3). WSHS (91.7) retransmits the WHID signal during non-school hours in the Sheboygan area.

WHID originates Hmong language programming on Saturday evenings from their Green Bay studios for the Hmong American community in northeast Wisconsin.

See also Wisconsin Public Radio

External links

Hmong-American culture in Wisconsin
HID
Wisconsin Public Radio
NPR member stations